Henry Maddocks may refer to:

 Sir Henry Maddocks (politician) (1871–1931), British Conservative Party Member of Parliament
 Henry Maddocks (RAF officer) (1898–?), British World War I flying ace

See also
 Henry Maddock (died 1824), English barrister and legal author
 Henry Maddock (cricketer) (1836–1888), New Zealand cricketer